Frederick William Banks (9 December 1888 – 16 January 1957) was an English professional footballer who made 72 appearances in the Football League playing for Birmingham and Nottingham Forest. He played as an outside forward.

Banks was born in Aston, now part of Birmingham. He played local football before joining Birmingham in 1909. He made his debut in the Second Division on 13 November 1909, deputising for Fred Chapple in a home game against Lincoln City which Birmingham won 1–0. This was the only first-team game he played for Birmingham.

He played non-league football for Stourbridge and Wellington Town, and then returned to the Football League with Nottingham Forest. In two spells with the club either side of a season with Stalybridge Celtic and interrupted by the First World War, Banks played 73 games in all competitions, before moving back to non-league with Worksop Town in 1920.

Banks went on to become Notts County's trainer, and he died in Nottingham in 1957.

References

1888 births
1957 deaths
Footballers from Birmingham, West Midlands
English footballers
Association football forwards
Birmingham City F.C. players
Stourbridge F.C. players
Telford United F.C. players
Nottingham Forest F.C. players
Stalybridge Celtic F.C. players
Worksop Town F.C. players
English Football League players